The surname Galbraith is derived from the Gaelic elements , meaning "stranger", and Breathnach, meaning "Briton". As such, the surname can be taken to mean "British foreigner", "British Scandinavian", "foreign Briton", or "stranger-Briton".

The surname is borne by members of Clan Galbraith. The earliest recorded chief of this family may be "", a man attested in 1193. This man's name could indicate that he was either of Welsh or North British ancestry.

Early examples of forms of the surname include: "" in 1208×1214; "" in 1208×1214; "" in 1208×1214; "" in 1239; "" in 1208×1241; and "" in  1208×1265.

People
 Alastair Galbraith (musician), musician from Dunedin, New Zealand
 Clare Calbraith, actor
 Daniel Galbraith (Ontario politician) (1813-1879) Scottish-Canadian farmer and politician
 Daniel Harcourt Galbraith (1878-1968), Canadian provincial politician
 Danny Galbraith (born 1990), Scottish footballer
 Declan Galbraith (born 1991), British singer
 Douglas Galbraith (1965-2018), Scottish historical novelist
 Evan Griffith Galbraith (1928–2008), United States diplomat
 Francis Joseph Galbraith (1913–1986), United States diplomat
 Frederick W. Galbraith (1874–1921), American businessman; second national commander of The American Legion (1920–1921)
 Gatewood Galbraith (1947–2012), a Kentucky lawyer, author and politician
 George Galbraith (born 1955), Danish ice hockey goaltender and coach
 George Galbraith (priest) (died 1911), Dean of Derry
 Georgie Starbuck Galbraith (1909–1980), American poet
 Jack Galbraith, former Scottish footballer
 James Galbraith (Canadian politician) (born 1940), Canadian Progressive Conservative politician
 James K. Galbraith (born 1952), United States economist, son of John Kenneth Galbraith
 Jo-Ann Galbraith (born 1985), Australian archer
 John Kenneth Galbraith (1908–2006), Canadian-born American economist
 Neil Galbraith, Australian curler
 Patrick Galbraith (ice hockey) (born 1986), Danish professional ice hockey goaltender
 Patrick Galbraith (born 1967), United States professional tennis player
 Paul Galbraith, (born 1964), Scottish-born classical guitarist
 Peter W. Galbraith (born 1950), United States diplomat and commentator, son of John Kenneth Galbraith
 Robert Galbraith, (born 1965), pen name of J.K. Rowling; writer of "The Cuckoo's Calling"
 Sam Galbraith (1945-2014), Scottish Labour Party politician
 Sheldon Galbraith (1922-2015), Canadian figure skating coach
 Tam Galbraith (1917–1982), Scottish Conservative and Unionist politician
 Thomas Dunlop Galbraith, 1st Baron Strathclyde (1891–1985), British politician
 Thomas Galbraith, 2nd Baron Strathclyde (born 1960), British Conservative Party politician
 Thomas J. Galbraith (mid-19th century), United States politician
 Vivian Hunter Galbraith, British historian
 W. R. Galbraith, (mid-late 19th century) Civil engineer in the United Kingdom
 Walter Galbraith (1918–1995), Scottish football player and manager

See also
 Galbraith, Iowa, a community in the United States
 4089 Galbraith, an asteroid
 Clan Galbraith, a Scottish clan
 Galbraith Mountain, local name for North Lookout Mountain near Bellingham, Washington
 Galbraith supermarkets
 Galbreath

Citations

Primary sources

Secondary sources

English-language surnames
Scottish surnames